Three Pals is a 1926 American silent romance film directed by Wilbur McGaugh and Bruce Mitchell and starring Marilyn Mills, Josef Swickard and William H. Turner.  Gary Cooper made one of his earliest screen appearances as an extra.

Cast
 Marilyn Mills as Betty Girard 
 Josef Swickard as Col. Girard 
 William H. Turner as Maj. Wingate 
 Martin Turner as Uncle Lude 
 Ralph Emerson as Larry Wingate 
 James McLaughlin as Wingate's Secretary 
 Gary Cooper as Car Driver Flirting with Betty

Preservation status
The film is preserved in the Library of Congress collection.

References

Bibliography
 Munden, Kenneth White. The American Film Institute Catalog of Motion Pictures Produced in the United States, Part 1. University of California Press, 1997.

External links

1926 films
1920s romance films
American romance films
Films directed by Bruce M. Mitchell
American silent feature films
American black-and-white films
1920s English-language films
1920s American films